Still Unravished - A Tribute To The June Brides is a tribute album to the English indie pop band The June Brides, consisting of cover versions of their songs. The liner notes were written by Dave Eggers and Everett True. The latter also features on the album, under the pseudonym 'The Legend!'.

Track listing

 The Instrumental - Manic Street Preachers
 Every Conversation - The Positions
 In The Rain - Lovejoy
 Sunday To Saturday - The Starlets
 Heard You Whisper - The Projects
 I Fall - Television Personalities
 Sick, Tired And Trunk - House of Mexico
 No Place Called Home - The Mad Scene
 Josef's Gone - Postal Blue
 On The Rocks - How To Swim
 We Belong - Bunny Grunt
 Heard You Whisper - Tompaulin
 This Town - The Legend!
 Waiting For A Change - Jeffrey Lewis
 Pound For Pound - The Tyde
 The Instrumental - The Jasmine Minks

References

Tribute albums
2006 compilation albums